475 °C embrittlement is the loss of plasticity in duplex stainless steel in the ferrite phase when it is heated in the range of  to . This type of embrittlement is due to precipitation hardening which can lead to brittle fracture failure.

Duplex stainless steel 

These contain 18-28% Cr and 4-8% Ni and are strong and have good corrosion resistance, particularly chloride stress corrosion and chloride pitting corrosion, and higher strength than standard austenitic stainless steels such as Type 304 or 316. Duplex steels have a higher chromium content compared to austenitic stainless steel, 20–28%; higher molybdenum, up to 5%; lower nickel, up to 9% and 0.05–0.50% nitrogen. They are therefore used extensively in the offshore oil and gas industry for pipework systems, manifolds, risers, etc. and in the petrochemical industry in the form of pipelines and pressure vessels.

Alpha (α) phase is a ferritic phase with body-centred cubic (BCC) structure, Imm [229] space group, 2.866 Å lattice parameter, and has one twinning system {112}<111> and three slip systems {110}<111>, {112}<111> and {123}<111>; however, the last system rarely activates. Gamma phase is austenitic with a face-centred cubic (FCC) structure, Fmm [259] space group, and 3.66 Å lattice parameter. It normally has more Ni, Cu, and interstitial C and N. Plastic deformation occurs in austenite more readily than in ferrite During deformation, straight slip bands form in the austenite grains and propagate to the ferrite-austenite grain boundaries, assisting in slipping the ferrite phase. Curved slip bands also form due to the bulk ferrite grain deformation.

Age hardening by spinodal decomposition 
Duplex stainless can have limited toughness due to its large ferritic grain size, and its tendencies to hardening and embrittlement at temperatures ranging from 280–500 °C, especially at 475 °C, where spinodal decomposition of the supersaturated solid ferrite solution into Fe-rich nanophase and Cr-rich nanophase, accompanied by G-phase precipitation, occurs. This makes the ferrite phase a preferential initiation site for micro-cracks. This is because aging encourages Σ3 {112}<111> ferrite deformation twinning at slow strain rate and room temperature in tensile or compressive deformation, nucleating from local stress concentration sites, and parent-twinning boundaries, with 60° (in or out) misorientation, are suitable for cleavage crack nucleation.

Spinodal decomposition refers to the spontaneous separation of a phase into two coherent phases via uphill diffusion, i.e., a negative diffusion coefficient , without a barrier to nucleation due to the phase being thermodynamically unstable (i.e., miscibility gap,  +  region in Figure 1), where  is the Gibbs free energy per mole of solution and the composition. It increases hardness and decreases magneticity. Miscibility gap describes the region in a phase diagram below the melting point of each compound where the atom disrupts the solid phase into the liquid of two separated stable phases.

Microscopy characterisation 

Using Field Emission Gun Transmission Electron Microscope FEG-TEM, the nanometre-scaled modulated structure of the decomposed ferrite was revealed as Cr-rich nanophase gave the bright image, and Fe-rich darker image. It also revealed that these modulated nanophases grow coarser with aging time. Decomposed phases start as irregular rounded shapes with no particular arrangement, but with time the Cr-rich nanophase takes a plat shape aligned in the <110> directions. Nevertheless, as the ferrite hardness increases with aging time, the hardness of the ductile austenite phase remains nearly unchanged  due to faster diffusivity in ferrite compared to the austenite. Nevertheless, austenite undergoes a substitutional redistribution of elements, enhancing galvanic corrosion between the two phases.

Mechanical effect 

Spinodal decomposition increases the hardening of the material due to the misfit between the Cr-rich and Fe-rich nano-phases, internal stress, and variation of elastic modulus. The formation of coherent (i.e., lattice matching) precipitates induces an equal but opposite strain, raising the system's free energy depending on the precipitate shape and matrix and precipitate elastic properties. Around a spherical inclusion, the distortion is purely hydrostatic. The embrittlement is caused by dislocations impediment/ locking by (mostly) the spinodally decomposed (modulated) matrix  and (strain around) G-phase precipitates  (i.e., internal stress relaxation by the formation of Cottrell atmosphere).

G-phase precipitates are a phase rich in Ni, Ti, and Si, but Cr and Mn may substitute Ti sites  and be named because it appears prominently at grain boundaries. G-phase precipitates occur during long-term aging, are encouraged by increasing Ni content in the ferrite phase, and reduce corrosion resistance significantly. It has ellipsoid morphology, FCC structure (Fmm), and 11.4 Å lattice parameter, with a diameter < 50 nm that increases with aging.

Treatment 
550 °C heat treatment can reverse spinodal decomposition but not affect the G-phase precipitates. The ferrite matrix spinodal decomposition can be substantially reversed by introducing an external pulsed electric current that changes the system's free energy due to the difference in electrical conductivity between the nanophases and the dissolution of G-phase precipitates. Cyclic loading suppresses spinodal decomposition, and radiation accelerates it but changes its nature from an interconnected network to isolated islands.

Further reading

References 

Steel
Materials degradation